Gail Roberta Martin (née Zuckman, born 1944) is an American biologist. She is professor emerita in the Department of Anatomy, University of California, San Francisco. She is known for her pioneering work on the isolation of pluripotent stem cells from normal embryos, for which she coined the term ‘embryonic stem cells’. She is also widely recognized for her work on the function of Fibroblast Growth Factors (FGFs) and their negative regulators in vertebrate organogenesis. She and her colleagues also made valuable contributions to gene targeting technology.

Personal life and education
Martin grew up in The Bronx, New York, the only child of a pharmacist and a schoolteacher. She graduated from James Monroe High School in 1960, and earned her A.B. in Zoology from the University of Wisconsin, Madison, WI in 1964. She then enrolled as a graduate student in the Department of Molecular Biology, University of California, Berkeley (UCB). It was a tumultuous time, because the student protest known as the Free Speech Movement took place in that academic year (1964–65), and Martin along with her fellow graduate students spent many hours in political discussion and activity. Martin did her doctoral work in Harry Rubin's laboratory, where she pursued several projects aimed at elucidating the mechanisms that control the growth of fibroblasts in vitro. She completed her Ph.D. thesis in 1971. It was during that time that she married Steven Martin, a British scientist who had come to Berkeley to do postdoctoral work in the Rubin laboratory.

Academic career
After completing her graduate studies, Martin and her husband moved to London. In 1973, she worked with Martin J. Evans at University College London. Evans was then working with teratocarcinomas (a type of tumor), which are of interest because they contain pluripotent stem cells (known as embryonal carcinoma, [EC] cells) from which all the differentiated cell types in the tumor arise. During the two years she spent working in Evans' laboratory, Martin devised a protocol for isolating and maintaining EC cells in the undifferentiated state and for differentiating them in vitro. This work  laid the groundwork for the future isolation of pluripotent stem cells from normal mouse and human embryos. In 1976, Martin and her husband returned to Berkeley, where he took up a faculty position at UCB and she began a year of postdoctoral work with Charles J. Epstein in the Department of Pediatrics at UCSF. During this period she and her colleagues demonstrated that female EC cells had two active X chromosomes and could be used to study X-chromosome inactivation in vitro.

In 1976 Martin joined the UCSF faculty and established her own laboratory, which was active until 2012. Her first major accomplishment was the isolation of pluripotent stem cells from normal mouse blastocysts. This was also achieved by Evans and Kaufman   in the same year. Subsequently, using sophisticated genetic methods that she helped to pioneer, Martin and her colleagues demonstrated the importance of FGF signaling in the development of many organs including the limb. Martin's laboratory also took the lead in studying the role of negative feedback mechanisms for regulating FGF signaling in the mammalian embryo These studies have led to an appreciation of the exquisite sensitivity of developmental and cell biological processes to even small changes in the level of FGF signaling.

During her tenure at UCSF, Martin served as director of the Graduate Program in Developmental Biology (1986-2009). She also was responsible, in collaboration with a software engineer, Jonathan Scoles, for the development of a database that provides a description of all the genetically altered mice housed at UCSF. This online resource helps researchers determine if mice carrying a particular genetic alteration are available at UCSF and to find out whom to contact about the possibility of obtaining them. Access to this information has saved investigators considerable time and money in acquiring mouse models for their studies and been a stimulus to collaboration between researchers.

Honors
Martin has received numerous awards including an American Cancer Society Faculty Research Award (1979–83), a Guggenheim Fellowship (1991–92), the Edwin Grant Conklin Medal from the Society for Developmental Biology (2002), the  Pearl Meister Greengard Prize (Rockefeller University), co-recipients: Beatrice Mintz and Elizabeth Robertson (2007), and the, FASEB Excellence in Science Award (2011).

She received an honorary Doctorate of Science (DSc [Med]) from University College London (2011). She has delivered numerous special lectures, including the George W. Brumley Jr. Memorial Lecture (Duke University) 2006, the UCSF Faculty Research Lecture (2008), and the Dame Anne McLaren Memorial Lecture (UK National Stem Cell Network), York, England (2011). She served as President of the Society for Developmental Biology (2006-2007), and was elected a fellow of the American Academy of Arts and Sciences (1991)  a member of the US National Academy of Sciences (Section 22, Cell and Developmental Biology) (2002) and a Foreign Member, Royal Society (2015)

Selected publications

Further reading
 Torassa Ulysses, 2001, "Profile: Gail Martin, UCSF scientist opened door; research has been built on her seminal work 20 years ago," at SFGATE, August 10, 2001, see , accessed 26 February 2015.
Stem Cell Research — Potential Solutions, Practical Challenges

References

Members of the United States National Academy of Sciences
University of California, San Francisco faculty
University of California, Berkeley alumni
Living people
Foreign Members of the Royal Society
21st-century American biologists
1944 births